The Devon General Hospital is a 21-bed acute care and continuing care facility in Devon, Alberta. There are 9 acute, 10 continuing, and 2  respite beds. The hospital provides 24-hour emergency services, as well as laboratory and radiology services.

Main Services
Additional health services housed in the facility include:
Public Health 
Home Care
Adult Day Program
Diabetes Education
Speech Language Rehabilitation Services
Community Nutrition 
Mental Health

References

Hospital buildings completed in 1954
Hospitals in Alberta
Edmonton Metropolitan Region
Hospitals established in 1954